Celastrina lucia, the lucia azure,  northern azure,  eastern spring azure or northern spring azure, is a species of butterfly of the family Lycaenidae. It is found eastern North America, ranging from the Maritimes south through the Appalachian Mountains to West Virginia.

The wingspan is between 22–35 mm. Adults are sexually dimorphic. The dorsal wing surface of males is blue, while females have a broad, dark brown outer forewing margin. They are on wing from April to July.

The larvae feed on Vaccinium species, including V. pallidum. The larvae may be green, yellow, pink or brown, depending on their food source.

Taxonomy
Until the early 1990s, most North American azures were thought to be a single species, Celastrina ladon. More recently, research has revealed that there are many different species of azures, including C. lucia, which had been treated as a subspecies of C. ladon.

Similar species
Cherry gall azure (C. serotina)
Holly azure (C. idella)
Spring azure (C. ladon)
Summer azure (C. neglecta)

Gallery

References

Celastrina
Taxa named by William Kirby (entomologist)
Butterflies described in 1837